Pat Hilton (born 1 May 1954) is an English former football player and manager. He played in The Football League with several noted clubs like Blackburn Rovers, and Gillingham. After retiring from football he made the transition to managing, and coached the Windsor Border Stars of the Canadian Professional Soccer League.

Playing career 
Hilton began his career with Brighton & Hove Albion in the Football League Third Division in 1972, and played under the management of Brian Clough, and Peter Taylor. In 1974, he signed with Blackburn Rovers, and won the Football League Third Division which promoted the club to the Football League Second Division. The following year he signed with Gillingham, where he appeared in 28 matches and recorded one goal. In 1976, he was loaned to Aldershot where he appeared in 13 matches. In 1977, he signed a contract with Southport, and finished with the club with 27 matches, and recorded five goals.

Managerial career 
After retiring from competitive football Hilton managed Gillingham's youth team, and later moved to Michigan. In 2004, he was appointed the first head coach for the newly formed Windsor Border Stars of the Canadian Professional Soccer League. In his debut season with Windsor he led the team to a third-place finish in the Western Conference, and clinched a postseason berth. He also claimed the club's first piece of silverware by winning the Open Canada Cup. For his achievements he was awarded by the league with the CPSL Coach of the Year award. During his five-year tenure with the organization he made the playoffs with the club four consecutive years, won two Open Canada Cups, and one AISL Championship.

References 

1954 births
Living people
English footballers
English football managers
Brighton & Hove Albion F.C. players
Blackburn Rovers F.C. players
Gillingham F.C. players
Aldershot F.C. players
Southport F.C. players
English Football League players
Canadian Soccer League (1998–present) managers
Association football forwards
People from Aylesham